Christian Mendoza (born 1987 in the Philippines, now living in Copenhagen, Denmark) is a singer who rose to popularity as the winner of Idols Denmark, the Danish version of Pop Idol. Christian won with 57% of the total vote against Mirza Radonjica.

Idols Denmark Performances
Top 30: 
Top 10: When A Man Loves A Woman by Percy Sledge
Top 9: She's A Bad Mama Jama by Carl Carlton
Top 8: Take On Me by A-Ha
Top 7: Smuk Som Et Stjerneskud by the Olsen Brothers
Top 6: You Are The Sunshine Of My Life by Stevie Wonder
Top 5: For Once In My Life by Frank Sinatra
Top 4: White Christmas by Bing Crosby
Top 4: Yesterday by The Beatles
Top 3: The Greatest Love Of All by Whitney Houston
Top 3: Rise & Fall by Sting & Craig David
Grand Final: Mystery To Me
Grand Final: She's A Bad Mama Jama by Carl Carlton
Grand Final: Babygirl by B2K

Discography

Album 
 Can't Break Me... (2004)

Singles 
 Mystery To Me (2003)
 It's All About You (2004)

External links

1987 births
21st-century Filipino male singers
21st-century Danish male singers
Idols (TV series) winners
Living people
English-language singers from the Philippines
English-language singers from Denmark
Filipino emigrants to Denmark